Brush Valley is an unincorporated community in Indiana County, Pennsylvania, United States. Brush Valley was founded by John Cresswell in 1803. The town was originally named Mechanicsburgh. It has its own ZIP code, 15720.

References

Unincorporated communities in Indiana County, Pennsylvania
Unincorporated communities in Pennsylvania